The Spider  is the  29th chapter (surah) of the Quran with 69 verses (āyāt).

Regarding the timing and contextual background of the believed revelation (asbāb al-nuzūl), it is an earlier "Meccan surah", which indicates a  revelation in Mecca as opposed to Medina. Early Muslims were persecuted in Mecca where Muhammed was not a leader, and not persecuted in Medina, where he was a protected leader.

The surah states that Nuh, Ibrahim, Lut, Shuaib, Hud, Saleh, Musa and Muhammad all were prophets of God. All of them endured hardships. For example, Noah was ridiculed often and Abraham was thrown into the fire. But God destroyed their people who transgressed. As it says in verse 40, So each We punished for his sin; of them was he on whom We sent down a violent storm, and of them was he whom the rumbling overtook, and of them was he whom We made to be swallowed up by the earth, and of them was he whom We drowned; and it did not beseem Allah that He should be unjust to them, but they were unjust to their own souls.

Summary
1-2 Religious faith is proved by trials
3 Evil deeds will surely be punished
4-7 The righteous shall be rewarded for their good deeds
8 Parents not to be obeyed when they oppose God's law
9 Salvation by faith and good works
10-11 Hypocrites exposed and rebuked
12-13 Unbelievers shall be punished for deceiving others by false promises
14-15 The enemies of Noah drowned for their unbelief
16 Abraham preached against idolatry
17 Abraham accused of being an impostor
18-19 He shows the idolaters how God's power is manifested in nature
20-22 He declares that none shall escape the judgment of God
23 His people attempt to burn him, but God saves him
24 He discourses against the idolatry of his people
25 Lot believes in Abraham, who determines to fly his country
26 God gives Abraham descendants who possess the gift of prophecy and the Scriptures
27-34 The story of Lot and his ministry in Sodom
35-36 Shuaib's ministry to the unbelieving Madianites
37 Ád and Thamúd destroyed in unbelief
38 Qárún, Pharaoh, and Hámán destroyed in unbelief
39 Various means by which God destroyed infidels
40 Idolatry likened to a spider's web
41 God knoweth the idols worshipped by men
42, 43 God's works and signs only understood by true believers
44 Muhammad is commanded to recite the Quran and to give himself to prayer
45 Muslims not to fight against Jews and Christians except in self-defence
45, 46 The Quran and the former Scriptures one revelation
47 The miracle of Muhammad's reading and writing a proof of the inspiration of the Quran
48 Unbelievers only reject the Quran
49 Muhammad challenged to work a miracle
50 The Quran itself a sufficient miracle
51, 52 God will judge between Muhammad and the infidels
53-55 The infidels call for judgment, and it will find them unprepared
56 Believers exhorted to fly from persecution
57-59  The reward of the righteous dead
60-63 God's works in creation and providence witness his being
64 The present life a vain show
65, 66  Unbelievers are ungrateful
67, 68 The ingratitude of the Arab idolaters
69  God will reward the faithful

Parable of the spider's house

Mustafa Khattab, author of the Clear Quran, notes that "Externally, the web is too flimsy to protect the spider against rain and strong wind. Internally, the spider’s family structure is fragile, since some species are cannibalistic, with the female preying on the male and the young eating their own mother."

References

External links
Quran 29 Clear Quran translation

Q29:2, 50+ translations, islamawakened.com

Parables in the Quran
Ankabut
Spiders in popular culture